James Herbert Reilly (March 11, 1890 – March 3, 1962) was an American swimmer. He competed in two events at the 1912 Summer Olympics.

References

1890 births
1962 deaths
American male swimmers
Olympic swimmers of the United States
Swimmers at the 1912 Summer Olympics
Sportspeople from New York City